(born 1977) is a male Japanese manga artist from Nagano, Japan. In 2002, he won the gold prize in the tenth round of the illustration division of the Dengeki Novel Prize under the name . In 2006, he debuted publicly as the artist for the Toshokan Sensō series of light novels written by Hiro Arikawa. Adabana has worked closely with Arikawa since then, illustrating her novels Kujira no Kare and Hankyū Densha as well.

References

Japanese illustrators
People from Nagano Prefecture
1977 births
Living people